Claudia Martín (born Claudia Martín Martínez on 28 August 1989 in Oaxaca de Juárez, Mexico) is a Mexican actress.

Early life 
Martin was born and raised in Oaxaca de Juárez, Mexico. She showed interest in acting and performing from a young age. During her childhood, she danced and sang. She earned a degree in Audiovisual Communication from Charles III University of Madrid. She lived in Madrid for four years and briefly lived in England where she studied English. After graduating, she returned to Mexico.

Acting career
When Martín studied in Madrid, she enrolled in acting classes and studied costume design. Upon returning to Mexico City, she worked at the media company, Televisa, as a costume designer for its various productions.  After a year, she quit her job and became auditioning at castings for Televisa which eventually led to her first acting roles. She eventually enrolled in Centro de Educación Artística, the drama school run by Televisa and graduated in 2015 after completing three-year course. She appeared in several school plays and productions during her time at CEA. Since 2015, Martín has acted in several television programs including the telenovela drama, Enamorándome de Ramón, where she had a co-starring role. In August 2017, she was announced as the lead for the telenovela, Sin tu mirada, a remake of the popular 1997 Mexican soap opera, Esmeralda. The part is her first starring role in a telenovela.

Television roles

References

External links 
 

1989 births
Living people
Mexican telenovela actresses
Actresses from Oaxaca